The Battle of Suixian–Zaoyang, also known as the Battle of Suizao was one of the 22 major engagements between the National Revolutionary Army (NRA) and Imperial Japanese Army (IJA) during the Second Sino-Japanese War. The Japanese launched a major two-pronged offensive that captured many cities and towns. However, their failure to defend against a series of coordinated Chinese counter-attacks forced them to completely withdraw, resulting in territorial control returning to the original status quo.

The battle 
At the end of April 1939, Japanese commanders sought to capitalise on their gains from their successful capture of Wuhan, as well as to relieve pressure on their base in the newly captured city. Thus, they deployed 113,000 troops in three divisions and one cavalry brigade to launch two simultaneous attacks on the cities of Suizhou and Zaoyang, along the Xiangyang-Huayuan Highway and Jingshan-Zhongxiang Highway respectively.

Japanese commander General Yasuji Okamura deployed the 13th and 16th Divisions from Zhongxiang to drive northwards along the Dahong mountain ranges and attack Zaoyang from the south on 1 May 1939. Zaoyang was protected by the Chinese 77th Corps. The single Chinese corps held fast against the fierce attack by the two Japanese divisions.

On 3 May, Japanese commander Lieutenant General Yamawaki Masataka dispatched the 3rd Division and 4th Cavalry Brigade to attack Suixian and Tongbai from Yingshan and Xinyang respectively in an attempt to encircle Tang Enbo and Li Pingxian's 11th and 31st Army Groups. Four days later, the 13th and 16th Divisions broke through Chinese 77th Corps' defensive lines, and successfully captured Zaoyang. By 12 May, the two Japanese divisions had also captured Tanghe, Nanyang and Xinye.

However, the Japanese were less successful in the Tongbai mountain ranges, where they faced the Chinese 13th, 84th, and 85th Corps, led by NRA commanders Zhang Zhen, Qin Lianfang, and Wang Zhonglian respectively. Here the Chinese succeeded in checking the Japanese offensive, preventing them from linking their two advancing columns.

Simultaneously, the Chinese 2nd and 33rd Army Groups, led by Sun Zhen and Zhang Zizhong respectively, arrived at the battlefield. They moved eastwards, crossing the Hanshui River and attacked the Japanese 13th and 16th Divisions' western flank. Meanwhile, Tang Enbo's 31st Army Group moved north from San Taidian to Miyang, before maneuvering northwest around Nanyang, and moving southwest to Xinye, attacking the Japanese there head-on, inflicting heavy casualties and forcing them to retreat. The Chinese then launched a coordinated counter-offensive, whereupon the various Japanese units were forced to withdraw. By May 20, the Chinese had recaptured all previously lost territory.

Aftermath 
During the month-long campaign, the Chinese incurred a total of 28,000 casualties, a significant portion of which was due to the Japanese Army's continuous and extensive use of air attacks and chemical weapons. On the other hand, the Japanese suffered 21,000 casualties. Although Chinese casualties were still a third greater than that of the Japanese, it was clear that by now the casualty margin was getting smaller and smaller.

Although the Japanese were initially successful in capturing many cities and towns, their inability to hold onto any of them resulted in their offensive operation ending in a complete failure. By the end of the battle, the Chinese Army had not only recaptured all positions, but also gained the ability to utilize mobilized warfare to launch counter-offensive into Japanese-held territory.

Gallery

References

Conflicts in 1939
1939 in China
1939 in Japan
Suixian-Zaoyang 1939
Battles involving the Republic of China 
Suixian-Zaoyang, Battle of
Military history of Hubei
April 1939 events
May 1939 events